Björn Erik Johansson (born January 15, 1956) is a Swedish former professional ice hockey defenceman.  He was drafted in the first round of both the 1976 NHL Amateur Draft and the 1976 WHA Amateur Draft, by the California Golden Seals and Toronto Toros, respectively.  He played 15 games in the National Hockey League with the Cleveland Barons, scoring one goal and one assist.

Career statistics

Regular season and playoffs

International

Totals do not include numbers from the 1975 World Junior Ice Hockey Championships.

External links

1956 births
Binghamton Dusters players
California Golden Seals draft picks
Cleveland Barons (NHL) players
Frölunda HC players
Living people
National Hockey League first-round draft picks
Sportspeople from Örebro
Phoenix Roadrunners (CHL) players
Rochester Americans players
Salt Lake Golden Eagles (CHL) players
Swedish ice hockey defencemen
Toronto Toros draft picks
World Hockey Association first round draft picks